Amy Nadya Finkelstein (born November 2, 1973) is a professor of economics at the Massachusetts Institute of Technology (MIT), the co-director and research associate of the Public Economics Program at the National Bureau of Economic Research, and the co-Scientific Director of J-PAL North America. She was awarded the 2012 John Bates Clark Medal for her contributions to economics. She was elected to the National Academy of Sciences and won a MacArthur "Genius" fellowship in 2018.

Education 
Finkelstein studied government at Harvard University, where she was a Truman Scholar and received an AB summa cum laude in 1995. At Harvard, her interest in economics was inspired in part by taking economist Lawrence Katz's course "Social Problems in the American Economy". She was a Marshall Scholar at Oxford University, where she received an M.Phil. in economics in 1997. She received her PhD in economics from MIT in 2001 under supervision of James M. Poterba and Jonathan Gruber.

Career 
Finkelstein was a Junior Fellow at the Harvard Society of Fellows for three years, after which she joined the MIT faculty in 2005 and received tenure within three years.

In 2016, MIT's School of Humanities, Arts, and Social Sciences named Finkelstein the John and Jennie S. MacDonald Professor for a five-year term. The professorship was established with a gift by Edmund MacDonald, and recognizes Finkelstein's outstanding achievements in the field of economics.

Research 
Finkelstein's primary expertise is in public finance and health economics, focusing particularly on health insurance. She conducts research into market failures and government intervention in insurance markets, and the impact of public policy on health care and health insurance. Together with Katherine Baicker, she is one of two principal investigators of the Oregon Health Insurance Experiment, a randomized evaluation of the impact of expanding Medicaid to low-income adults. Her research has shown that newly enrolled Medicaid patients make more trips overall to providers after acquiring insurance, make more visits to emergency rooms, and benefit financially from having insurance, among other findings. Finkelstein said that the body of research, including her work on the effects of the 2008 Medicaid expansion in Oregon, have made her confident that health insurance improves health.

Awards 
In 2008, Finkelstein was awarded the Elaine Bennett Research Prize by the Committee on the Status of Women in the Economics Profession (CSWEP), for her contributions to the economics profession. In 2012, she was awarded the John Bates Clark Medal from the American Economic Association. The award cited her research as "a model of how theory and empirics can be combined in creative ways". In 2018, Finkelstein received a MacArthur "Genius" Grant.

Personal life 
Finkelstein is Jewish. She was born in New York City in 1973 to biologist parents, who both earned doctorates at The Rockefeller University. In 1940, her mother immigrated to the United States from Poland, where her maternal grandmother had received a doctorate in comparative literature at the University of Warsaw. 

Finkelstein is married to MIT economist Benjamin Olken.

Select publications

References

External links

 MIT Department of Economics: Amy Finkelstein
 NBER: Amy Finkelstein
 Abdul Latif Jameel Poverty Action Lab (J-PAL): Amy Finkelstein

1973 births
Alumni of the University of Oxford
21st-century American economists
20th-century American Jews
American women economists
Health economists
Fellows of the American Academy of Arts and Sciences
Harvard College alumni
Living people
MacArthur Fellows
Marshall Scholars
MIT School of Humanities, Arts, and Social Sciences alumni
MIT School of Humanities, Arts, and Social Sciences faculty
Fellows of the Econometric Society
Members of the National Academy of Medicine
21st-century American Jews
20th-century American women
21st-century American women